is a Japanese light novel series by Kentarō Katayama, with illustrations by Yamato Yamamoto. Three novels were published by Shueisha, under their Super Dash Bunko imprint, between 2004 and 2005. The series remains unfinished. Under the title , the first story in the series won an honorable mention at the Super Dash Novel Rookie of the Year Awards in 2003.

In 2009, a two-episode original video animation (OVA) adaptation was exclusively bundled with the pre-order editions of Kure-nai (another series by Katayama) DVD volumes 3 and 4.

A manga adaptation, storyboarded by Daisuke Furuya and illustrated by Hiroshi Hiraoka, was serialized in Shueisha's seinen manga magazine Ultra Jump from July 2019 to January 2021, with its chapters collected in two tankōbon volumes.

Plot
 is a delinquent high school boy who just wants to be left alone. At first Juu wants nothing to do with Ame, but after a classmate is murdered, he accepts her help as he looks for the killer.

Media

Light novel
Written by Kentarō Katayama and illustrated by Yamato Yamamoto, the Denpa teki na Kanojo novel spawned three volumes, published under the Super Dash Bunko imprint, and released from September 22, 2004, to July 22, 2005. The series remains unfinished.

Volume list

Original video animation
The two OVA episodes are based on the first and third light novels. The second novel does not have an OVA adaptation. Juu is voiced by Yoshimasa Hosoya and Ame is voiced by Ryou Hirohashi. The ending theme for the first episode, is performed by Tenohira. The ending theme for the second episode, "door", is performed by Rumika.

Episode list

Manga
A manga adaptation, storyboarded by Daisuke Furuya and illustrated by Hiroshi Hiraoka, was serialized in Shueisha's seinen manga magazine Ultra Jump from June 19, 2020, to January 19, 2021. Its chapters were collected in two tankōbon volumes, released on January 19, 2021.

References

External links

 Light novel series official website 
 

2004 Japanese novels
2009 anime OVAs
Anime and manga based on light novels
Book series introduced in 2004
Brain's Base
Light novels
Seinen manga
Shueisha franchises
Shueisha manga
Super Dash Bunko